Varadkar is an Indian surname. Notable people with the surname include:

Leo Varadkar (born 1979), Irish politician and physician
Mitalee Jagtap Varadkar, Indian actress

See also
 Varadka

Indian surnames